Luis Enrique Rueda (born 11 January 1972 in San Rafael, Mendoza) is an Argentine former footballer and head coach that played as a striker.

Club career
Nicknamed "El Cóndor", Rueda began his professional career at Gimnasia y Tiro in 1996. His impressive displays awoke the interest of Spanish club Extremadura, which later signed him for the 1997-1998 season. In his return to Argentina, he played for Córdoba's fierce rivals Belgrano and subsequently Talleres. His good form rewarded him with a transfer to Argentine giant Racing Club. After a year with the academia he was loaned to club Universidad de Chile just to be back in Avalleneda the following year to face Copa Libertadores 2003 with Racing. In that tournament Rueda excelled with 5 goals scored in 8 games. Gimnasia de La Plata then acquired his rights hoping to benefit from his goals, but Rueda was unable to match the performance on previous seasons. He then played for Olimpo de Bahía Blanca (2004) and later with Quilmes (2005), where he saw some action in Copa Libertadores of that year. In 2006, he moved back to Chile to join La Serena. The following season, he received some offers from Argentina, and ended up signing with second division club San Martín de Tucumán before landing a job with Gimnasia y Tiro, the club that launched his football career initially.

External links
 Argentine Primera statistics  

1972 births
Living people
Sportspeople from Mendoza Province
Argentine footballers
Association football forwards
Racing Club de Avellaneda footballers
CF Extremadura footballers
Expatriate footballers in Spain
Argentine expatriate sportspeople in Spain
Club de Gimnasia y Esgrima La Plata footballers
Gimnasia y Tiro footballers
San Martín de Tucumán footballers
Club Atlético Belgrano footballers
Talleres de Córdoba footballers
Olimpo footballers
Quilmes Atlético Club footballers
Deportes La Serena footballers
Universidad de Chile footballers
Argentine Primera División players
Expatriate footballers in Chile
Argentine expatriate footballers